M. V. Ramana is Professor and Simons Chair in Disarmament, Global and Human Security at the University of British Columbia, and Director of Liu Institute for Global Issues, at the School of Public Policy and Global Affairs. A physicist by training, he previously worked at the Nuclear Futures Laboratory and the Program on Science and Global Security, both at Princeton University. Ramana is a member of the International Panel on Fissile Materials, the Canadian Pugwash Group, the International Nuclear Risk Assessment Group, and the team that produces the annual World Nuclear Industry Status Report.

Ramana has written many papers and is the author of The Power of Promise: Examining Nuclear Energy in India (Penguin Books, 2012). He is co-editor of Prisoners of the Nuclear Dream (New Delhi: Orient Longman, 2003) and author of Bombing Bombay? Effects of Nuclear Weapons and a Case Study of a Hypothetical Explosion (Cambridge, MA: International Physicians for the Prevention of Nuclear War, 1999).

M. V. Ramana obtained his Ph.D. in Physics from Boston University in 1994 and was a post-doctoral fellow at the Department of Physics, University of Toronto and the Center for International Studies, Massachusetts Institute of Technology. In 2014, Ramana received the Leo Szilard Award of the American Physical Society.

Selected articles
Fissile materials in South Asia and the implications of the US-India nuclear deal, Science and Global Security, 2006, 14 (2-3), 117-143
Nuclear power: Economic, safety, health, and environmental issues of near-term technologies, Annual Review of Environment and Resources 34, 2009, 127-152
Economics of nuclear power from heavy water reactors, Economic and Political Weekly, 2005,1763-1773
Fast breeder reactor programs: History and status, International Panel on Fissile Materials Research Report, 8, 2010
Nuclear power and the public, Bulletin of the Atomic Scientists, 2011, 67 (4), 43-51
India, Pakistan and the Bomb, Scientific American, 2001, 285 (6), 60-71
Weapon-grade plutonium production potential in the Indian prototype fast breeder reactor, Science and Global Security, 2007, 15 (2), 85-105
Beyond our imagination: Fukushima and the problem of assessing risk, Bulletin of the Atomic Scientists, 2011, 19 April
Early Warning in South Asia—Constraints and Implications, Science & Global Security, 2003, 11 (2-3), 109-150
Nuclear Power in India: Failed Past, Dubious Future, 2007, Available at www. npec-web. org/Frameset. asp
The risks and consequences of nuclear war in South Asia, Out of the Nuclear Shadow, edited by S. Kothari, and Z. Mian, 2001, 185-196
Costing plutonium: economics of reprocessing in India, International Journal of Global Energy Issues, 2007, 27 (4), 454-471
The nuclear confrontation in South Asia, SIPRI Yearbook 2003: Armaments, Disarmament and International Security, 195-212
Nuclear power and the public. Bulletin of the Atomic Scientists. 2011;67(4):43-51. doi:10.1177/0096340211413358

See also
Frank N. von Hippel
Edwin Lyman
Mycle Schneider
Amory Lovins
Benjamin K. Sovacool 
International Campaign to Abolish Nuclear Weapons

References

External links
Google Scholar Entry
The Woodrow Wilson Center's Nuclear Proliferation International History Project or NPIHP is a global network of individuals and institutions engaged in the study of international nuclear history through archival documents, oral history interviews and other empirical sources.

People associated with nuclear power
Sustainability advocates
Living people
21st-century American physicists
Princeton University faculty
Nuclear weapons policy
Year of birth missing (living people)